Ana Ollo Hualde (born 24 January 1965) is a Navarrese politician, Minister of Citizen Relations of Navarre since July 2015 and Spokesperson of the Government of Navarre from July 2015 to September 2016.

References

1965 births
Government ministers of Navarre
Geroa Bai politicians
Living people
Politicians from Navarre